Shenzhen Special Zone Press Tower is a  tall skyscraper located in the Futian borough of Shenzhen, China. The tower was completed in 1998 and has 47 floors above ground and 3 underground floors.

It is 187 metres to the roof and 167 metres to the main roof above the curved glass curtain.

See also
 List of skyscrapers

References

External links
 SkyscraperPage.com's entry
 Emporis.com - Building ID 121573

Skyscraper office buildings in Shenzhen
Office buildings completed in 1998